Marie Weaver is an American artist who specializes in ceramic sculpture, printmaking, book arts, and graphic design. Weaver earned a B. A. from the University of Vermont and a Master of Fine Arts degree from Syracuse University.
Weaver lives and works in Philadelphia, Pennsylvania. Weaver's career began as an apprentice to Vermont printmaker Sabra Field and evolved into graphic design. From 1990 through 2002 she was head of the graphic design program in the Department of Art and Art History at The University of Alabama at Birmingham. In 2003, Weaver returned full-time to the practice of fine art. She is married to Stephen Harvey, a professor at the University of Pennsylvania.

Work
In 2007, Weaver's work was included in the exhibition "Atlanta Printmakers Studio", Swan Coach House Gallery curated by Marianne Lambert, Atlanta, Georgia

In 2006, Weaver was selected by curator and juror, Mark Hosford of Vanderbilt University to be part of the "Southern Printmaking Biennale", North Georgia College & State University, Dahlonega, Georgia.

UpSouth, a group show partially funded by the Andy Warhol Foundation for the Visual Arts and the National Endowment for the Arts, traveled to several venues across Birmingham, Alabama in 1999, including Space One Eleven, Birmingham Civil Rights Institute, the University of Alabama at Birmingham, Visual Arts Gallery, and Agnes Gallery. It

In "Four Voices: Echoes," (Bare Hands Gallery, Birmingham, AL) her work was shown with Janice Kluge (sculptor), Lucy Jaffe (painter), and Sonja Rieger (photographer) and Marie Weaver (printmaker).

"This Day in History," Center for Book Arts, NYC, 1995. Annual organized by Brian Hannon also exhibited the work of Miriam Cassell, Ted Clausen, Adriane Herman, Mary Ellen Long and Claire Jeanine Satin among many others.

Her work has been published in various periodicals, including Art Papers, The Atlanta Journal-Constitution, The Birmingham News, and books such as Innovative Low-budget Design (New York City), Event Flyer Graphics (Tokyo, Japan) and White Graphics (Cincinnati, Ohio).

Weaver has exhibited primarily in the Southeast and New York including Agnes Gallery, Bare Hands Gallery, Center For Book Arts (NYC), Boston Street Gallery (Philadelphia), Southern Printmaking Biennale, Gainesville State College, Georgia Perimeter Gallery,  Space One Eleven, Visual Arts Gallery at the University of Alabama at Birmingham.

The Marie Weaver and Steve Harvey Endowed Scholarship Fund for Graphic Design was set up in 2003 by the University of Alabama at Birmingham in honor of associate professor of graphic design Marie Weaver and her husband, professor of biochemistry and molecular genetics Stephen C. Harvey, Ph.D. for their strong support of the arts at UAB.

Quotes
 "Moments of change inform my work. The change could be something as subtle as the exchange of a glance, a fleeting shadow or a sudden realization....In creating compositions that reflect moments of change, I frequently use birds as metaphor—for transitions, as models of adaptability, as harbingers of danger, as symbols of the spirit. -Marie Weaver

Books and Catalogs
 "Aging," by Marie Weaver, Number 1, Edition of 1, Center For Book Arts, Brian Hannon coordinator, 1995, artist's book
 "White Graphics: The Power of White in Graphic Design" (Paperback) by Gail Deiber Finke, work included by Marie Weaver
 "Graphically Speaking Women," Space One Eleven, Ruth Stevens Appelhof (Executive Director, Guild Hall of East Hampton, NY) 2001
 "UpSouth" by bell hooks, Emma Amos and Antoinette Spanos Nordan, University Press, University of Alabama, Birmingham, 1999, pp 70–73
 "The World's Women On-Line! Women and Information Technology: An Electronic Art Networking Event" (In conjunction with the United Nations' Fourth World Conference on Women: Action for Equality, Development, and Peace; Beijing, China, 30 August-15 September 1995. Pilot Internet Event at Arizona State University's Computing Commons Gallery, March; subsequent CD-ROM), online catalog

References

External links
 Marie Weaver Official website
 Center For Book Arts  Weaver, Unique "Aging" 1995
UAB Department of Art and Art History
 https://www.uab.edu/cas/art/give

Living people
Year of birth missing (living people)
Artists from Alabama
Artists from Georgia (U.S. state)
Artists from Philadelphia
American multimedia artists
American women painters
American printmakers
Book artists
21st-century American painters
American graphic designers
Women graphic designers
21st-century American women artists
American women printmakers